Michał Gębura (born 10 November 1964) is a Polish footballer. He played in three matches for the Poland national football team in 1991.

References

External links
 

1964 births
Living people
Polish footballers
Poland international footballers
Association football defenders
People from Starachowice